The 1920 Paris–Roubaix was the 21st edition of the Paris–Roubaix, a classic one-day cycle race in France. The single day event was held on 4 April 1920 and stretched  from Paris to its end in a velodrome in Roubaix. The winner was the Belgian Paul Deman.

Results

References

Paris–Roubaix
Paris–Roubaix
Paris–Roubaix
Paris–Roubaix